Jan Wincenty Maciejko (2 January 1913 — 21 October 1993), was a Polish ice hockey goaltender. He played for Cracovia during his career. He also played for the Polish national team at the 1948 Winter Olympics and several World Championships. During the invasion of Poland at the onset of the Second World War he served in the Karpaty Army and was wounded near the town of Biłgoraj, and later fought with the Home Army. For this he was made a knight of the Virtuti Militari.

References

External links
 

1913 births
1993 deaths
Ice hockey players at the 1948 Winter Olympics
Knights of the Virtuti Militari
MKS Cracovia (ice hockey) players
Olympic ice hockey players of Poland
Polish ice hockey goaltenders
Sportspeople from Tarnów
Polish Austro-Hungarians
Polish military personnel of World War II
Home Army members